New 7 Wonders of Nature (2007–2011) was an initiative started in 2007 to create a list of seven natural wonders chosen by people through a global poll. It was the second in a series of Internet-based polls led by Swiss-born Canadian Bernard Weber and organized by the New 7 Wonders Foundation, a Swiss-based foundation which Weber founded. The initiative followed an earlier New7Wonders of the World campaign, and attracted 100 million votes from around the world before voting finished on November 11, 2011.

Stages of the campaign

The New 7 Wonders of Nature campaign started in 2007, immediately after the campaign to elect the man-made New 7 Wonders of the World, in which more than 100 million votes were cast. From over 440 participants representing over 220 countries and through a national qualification and race to become one of the Top 77, as well as the recommendations of the Panel of Experts led by Prof. Federico Mayor, the list of 28 "Official Finalist Candidates" was determined. Voting until November 2011, during which time the New 7 Wonders World Tour planned to visit each of the finalists to allow them to present themselves to the voters across the globe.

Criticisms
Indonesia's Vice-Minister for Tourism said the company running the New 7 Wonders campaign used underhanded tactics, threatening to remove Indonesia's Komodo National Park from the list if Indonesia refused to host a declaration ceremony for $35M.  Nothing in the New 7 Wonders voting procedure prohibited repetitive voting, making the results subject to government and tourism industry campaigns to vote often for local sites with the financial incentive of increased tourism.
Although New 7 Wonders is a non-profit organization that under US law has absolutely no disclosure of accounts, many activities related to administering voting and other logistical duties are run by the for-profit organization New Open World Corporation.

In South Korea, over the past four years, millions of Koreans and non-Koreans at home and abroad were encouraged by the central and Jeju provincial governments to make phone calls to vote and help the island win the designation. Employees of Jeju Special Self-Governing Province of South Korea made hundreds of millions of international phone calls to ensure Jeju island was selected as one of the New 7 Wonders of Nature in a worldwide poll. The payments estimated to be about 20 billion won ($17 million).

Winners

Finalists

Top 77

See also
New7Wonders Cities
New 7 Wonders of the World
Wonders of the World

References

External links
 
 TV segment on Canada AM where travel expert Loren Christie explains the voting procedure

Cultural lists
Nature-related lists
Projects established in 2007